Mae Reeves (October 29, 1912 – December 14, 2016) was a pioneering milliner who was famous for her custom-made hats. She was active in her field from 1940 until 1997.

Early life
Mae Reeves was born Lula Mae Grant, on October 29, 1912, in Vidalia, Georgia, to Samuel and Bessie Grant. She was the second oldest of 6 siblings.

Education
When she was 16 years old Reeves enrolled in Georgia State Teacher's College, in Savannah. After receiving her teaching credential, she began work as a teacher in Lyons, Georgia. She also wrote for the Savannah Tribune about social, school and church issues. Reeves attended the Chicago School of Millinery during her summers away from teaching, learning how to make "one of a kind" handmade hats.

Career
In 1934 Reeves moved to Philadelphia to work at a women's clothing shop on South Street. She created many hats while employed there, but her dream was to open her own hat shop, which she did in 1942.
 
Reeves received a $500 bank loan   from Citizens and Southern Bank, and at the age of 28 she opened "Mae's Millinery Shop," located at 1630 South Street. By so doing she became one of the first African American women to own her own business in downtown Philadelphia.

Her clients included celebrities such as Ella Fitzgerald, Lena Horne, Eartha Kitt, Marian Anderson, and socialites from illustrious families, including the DuPonts and the Annenbergs. Women from all professions and from church also came to purchase hats from Reeves. She made trips to New York City and Paris to procure materials for her specialty, custom-made hats.
 
In 1953 Reeves opened a second shop near other successful businesses at 41 North 60th Street. She continued to create hats until 1997, when she was 85 years old.  That year the hat shop closed, and several years later Reeves moved to a retirement home.  Reeves' daughter Donna Limerick arranged for the contents of the shop to be donated to the Smithsonian.

Community life and professional organizations
Reeves and her husband Joel belonged to Our Lady of the Rosary Church for 40 years. She was a member of the Ladies Auxiliary of the Knights of Columbus, the National Association of Fashion and Accessory Designers, and the NAACP. She was also the president of the 60th Street Business Association.

Honors and recognition
July 27, 2010 was declared "Hats Off to Mae Day," by the city of Philadelphia. Philadelphia Mayor Michael Nutter awarded her the prestigious Philadelphia Liberty Bell prize. The celebration was organized by the Philadelphia Retail Marketing Alliance and hosted by the African American Museum of Philadelphia. 
She was honored with the "Pioneer" award from the Philadelphia Multicultural Affairs Congress on October 29, 2010, on her 98th birthday.

Smithsonian
The Smithsonian National Museum of African American History and Culture obtained Reeves' collection of vintage hats, and antique furniture from her millinery shop, in addition to other personal items, in 2009. In 2016 the museum opened with a permanent exhibit of Reeves' extensive collection, including the shop's original red-neon sign, sewing machine, and antique furniture.

Personal life
Reeves was first married to William Mincey, whom she met while teaching in Lyons. Together they had one son, William "Sonny" Mincey, Jr.  In 1944 she married Joel Reeves, who worked at The Philadelphia Inquirer and also owned a catering company. They had two children together, Donna Limerick Pitsenberger,(former NPR producer)  and Reginald Reeves. 
 
When Reeves died on December 14, 2016 she was survived by nine grandchildren, thirteen great-grandchildren, and eight great-great grandchildren.

References

American women in business
1912 births
2016 deaths
African-American company founders
American company founders
American women company founders
African-American women in business
People from Georgia (U.S. state)
American milliners
African-American businesspeople
African-American centenarians
American centenarians
Women centenarians
20th-century African-American people
21st-century African-American people
20th-century African-American women
21st-century African-American women